The Venizelos–Tittoni agreement was a secret non-binding agreement between the Prime Minister of Greece, Eleftherios Venizelos, and the Italian Minister of Foreign Affairs, Tommaso Tittoni, in July 1919, during the Paris Peace Conference.

Main terms
The agreement was an effort to achieve an agreement about the conflicting territorial claims of the two countries.

Greece pledged to support the Italian claims over Vlorë and the establishment of an Italian protectorate over Albania. In Asia Minor, Greece would support the Italian claims over the parts of the sanjaks of Aydın and Menteshe, which were not already captured by the Greek army. A line of demarcation between Greek and Italian zones was drawn in the Maeander River valley. Greece would secure also for Italy a free zone at the port of Smyrna (under Greek administration from May 1919).
Italy pledged to support the Greek territorial claims over Northern Epirus and transfer the Dodecanese to Greece, except for the island of Rhodes, which would remain under Italian rule until such time as Cyprus would be ceded to Greece by Britain, at which time a referendum would be held for union with Greece.

Developments
In January 1920, Venizelos made known the agreement to the Supreme Allied Council with no negative reaction. 
The stance of Italy changed in July 1920, when the new Italian Minister of Foreign Affairs, Carlo Sforza, with a secret note to the Greek government renounced the agreement. Formally, the agreement was renounced by Italy on August 1922.

See also
Zone of Smyrna
Treaty of Sèvres
Partition of Albania
Partitioning of the Ottoman Empire

References

Sources
 L'Accordo Tittoni-Venizelos

Eleftherios Venizelos
Paris Peace Conference (1919–1920)
Treaties of the Kingdom of Italy (1861–1946)
Treaties of the Kingdom of Greece
Secret treaties
World War I treaties
Greece–Italy relations
History of the Dodecanese
Greco-Turkish War (1919–1922)
Megali Idea